CTE World (or Corporate Thugz Entertainment also relaunched on October 14, 2022 as CTE New World) is an American record label founded by American rapper Jeezy & his former manager Demetrius “Kinky B” Ellerbee. In December 2012, Young Jeezy signed a distribution partnership between Corporate Thugz and Atlantic. USDA member Boo Rossini is the label's president.

History
Corporate Thugz released its first album in 2001, Young Jeezy's Thuggin' Under the Influence (T.U.I.), followed by Come Shop wit Me. In 2005, Young Jeezy got a deal with Def Jam South and The Island Def Jam and released his 1st major label studio album Let's Get It: Thug Motivation 101. Then in 2006 he released his 2nd major label studio album The Inspiration and in 2007 formed the rap group United Streets Dopeboyz of America (USDA) and signed Slick Pulla, Blood Raw, 211, JW and Boo Rossini to Corporate Thugz and released his label's 3rd studio album and USDA's debut studio album Young Jeezy Presents USDA: Cold Summer. In 2008 Young Jeezy released The Recession.

In 2011, Young Jeezy signed Freddie Gibbs, Tone Trump, and Scrilla to Corporate Thugz. Freddie Gibbs left Corporate Thugz in late 2012, and after leaving the label Gibbs said "Anything he (Young Jeezy) tells you is fake." This laid the groundwork for Gibbs's album ESGN and the diss records directed at Jeezy. On New Year's Eve 2012 Scrilla announced that he had asked for and received his release from Corporate Thugz, and that there were no hard feelings. First action in the new imprint deal with Atlantic, Craig Kallman and Jeezy named Steven "Steve-O" Carless as A&R of Atlantic and President of Corporate Thugz. In early 2013 Young Jeezy signed Detroit hip hop group Doughboyz Cashout and later that year West Coast rapper YG was added to the record label. On August 13, 2013, the label released a compilation mixtape featuring Jeezy, Doughboyz Cashout, and YG titled Boss Yo Life Up Gang. The mixtape was supported by the singles "My Nigga" by YG and "Mob Life" by Doughboyz Cashout, both featuring Young Jeezy. On November 20, 2013 Young Jeezy and Corporate Thugz via Twitter announced he had signed the label to Roc Nation.

Roster

Current artists
 Jeezy
 YG
 Boo Rossini
 Boston George
 HatiBabi

Former artists
 2Eleven (2006–12)
 Blood Raw (2005–09) 
 Freddie Gibbs (2011–12)
 Lil Chris (2007–14)
 Roccett (2006–09)
 Slick Pulla (2004–13)
 Wink Loc (2012–14)
 Tone Trump (2012–14)
 Scrilla (2011–12)
 JW (2009-2013)
 Screwww (2008-?)
 B.A.M.A. (2009–10)
 Doughboyz Cashout (2013-2016)

Discography
Thuggin' Under the Influence (T.U.I.) (2001) by Jeezy
Come Shop wit Me (2003) by Jeezy
Let's Get It: Thug Motivation 101 (2005) by Jeezy
The Inspiration (2006) by Jeezy
Cold Summer (2007) by U.S.D.A.
My Life: The True Testimony (2008) by Blood Raw
The Recession (2008) by Jeezy
Lord Giveth, Lord Taketh Away (2011) by Freddie Gibbs
The After Party (2011) by U.S.D.A.
Thug Motivation 103 (2011) by Jeezy
Boss Yo Life Up Gang (2013) by CTE World
My Krazy Life (2014) by YG
Seen It All: The Autobiography (2014) by Jeezy
Church In These Streets (2015) by Jeezy
Still Brazy (2016) by YG
Blow Talk (2017) by Boston George
Baking Soda Boston: Tha Bricktape (2019) by Boston George
TM 104 (2019) By Jeezy
Baking Soda Boston 2 (2020) By Boston George

References

American record labels
Companies based in Atlanta
Gangsta rap record labels
Hip hop record labels
Labels distributed by Warner Music Group
Record labels established in 1998
Vanity record labels
Jeezy